Eschershausen is a municipality in the district of Holzminden, in Lower Saxony, Germany. It is situated approximately 20 km northeast of Holzminden, and 50 km south of Hanover.

Eschershausen was the seat of the former Samtgemeinde ("collective municipality") Eschershausen.

Personalities

Honorary citizen 
 Wilhelm Raabe (1831-1910), German writer, honorary citizenship in 1901
 Hans Scheibert (1887-1969), founder of the Deutsche Schlauchbootfabrik (Dinghy factory), (DSB), honorary citizenship in 1967

Sons and daughters of the city 

 Wilhelm Raabe (1831-1910), German writer
 Georg Bode (1838-1910), German jurist, naturalist and historian

References

Holzminden (district)
Duchy of Brunswick